Events in the year 1948 in Turkey.

Parliament
 8th Parliament of Turkey

Incumbents
President – İsmet İnönü 
Prime Minister – Hasan Saka 
Leader of the opposition – Celal Bayar

Ruling party and the main opposition
 Ruling party – Republican People's Party (CHP)
 Main opposition -Democrat Party (DP)

Cabinet
16th government of Turkey (up to 10 June)
17th government of Turkey (from 10 June)

Events
30 January – Akbank was founded
12 March – Earthquake around Kahramanmaraş.
1 May – Hürriyet newspaper began, its publication life
8 May – Prime minister Hasan Saka resigned because the policy of his cabinet towards the opposition was considered too mild. Nevertheless, he formed the next government.
4 July – Aid Turkey branch was founded
19 July – Nation Party was founded
17 October – By elections
10 December – Turkey became a member of UNESCO

Births
1 March – Ertuğrul Günay, government minister
27 April – Nil Burak (Pembe Nihal Munsif), singer
31 May – Ahmet Vefik Alp, architect
24 June – Ayşe Soysal, female mathematician 
12 September – Aziz Kocaoğlu, mayor of İzmir
20 October – Melih Gökçek, politician
17 December – Kemal Kılıçdaroğlu, chairman of the CHP

Deaths
26 January – Kazım Karabekir (born 1882), retired general
8 March – Hulusi Behçet (born 1889), MD
2 April – Sabahattin Ali (born 1907) writer
30 June – Prens Sabahattin (born 1879), politician and sociologist
21 September – Çerkez Ethem (born 1886), former militia leader

Gallery

See also
Turkey at the 1948 Summer Olympics
Turkey at the 1948 Winter Olympics

References

 
Years of the 20th century in Turkey
Turkey
Turkey
Turkey